The finals and the qualifying heats of the Women's 400 metres Freestyle event at the 1993 FINA Short Course World Championships were held in Palma de Mallorca, Spain.

Finals

Qualifying heats

See also
1992 Women's Olympic Games 400m Freestyle
1993 Men's European LC Championships 400m Freestyle

References
 Results
 swimrankings

F
1993 in women's swimming